KTTR may refer to:

 KTTR (AM), a radio station (1490 AM) licensed to serve Rolla, Missouri, United States
 KTTR-FM, a radio station (99.7 FM) licensed to serve St. James, Missouri
 KTTR-LP, a defunct low-power radio station (95.5 FM) formerly licensed to serve Quinlan, Texas, United States